Charles Edwin Devenish (13 January 1874  – 11 January 1922) was a South African international rugby union player. Born in Victoria West, he first played provincial rugby for Griqualand West (now known as the Griquas). He made his only Test appearance for South Africa during Great Britain's 1896 tour. He played as a forward in the 2nd Test of the series, a 17–8 loss at the Wanderers. Devenish died in 1922, in Kimberley, at the age of 47.

References

1874 births
1922 deaths
People from Victoria West
South African rugby union players
South Africa international rugby union players
Rugby union forwards
Rugby union players from the Northern Cape
Griquas (rugby union) players